Madritel Comunicaciones S.A. was a Spanish multi system operator of digital cable television and other services.

In 1999, the company was owned by Telecom Italia and Spanish electricity companies Endesa and Union Fenosa.

In 2002, it was merged into AunaCable.

References

External links 
 Website

Cable television companies of Spain
Defunct telecommunications companies
2002 disestablishments in Spain
Telecommunications companies disestablished in 2002